Plunkett & Macleane is a 1999 British historical action comedy film directed by Jake Scott, and starring Robert Carlyle, Jonny Lee Miller and Liv Tyler. Gary Oldman was executive producer.

The story was co-written by Neal Purvis and Robert Wade. It follows the story of Captain James Macleane (Miller) and Will Plunkett (Carlyle), two men in eighteenth century Britain who are both struggling to survive. The characters are loosely based on two genuine highwaymen of the eighteenth century, James MacLaine and William Plunkett, although the story bears little relation to their actual lives.

Plot 
1748 England is infested with highwaymen — men such as Will Plunkett (Robert Carlyle), a London-based criminal working with his partner Rob (Iain Robertson). When Rob is killed by Thief Taker General Chance (Ken Stott) after a botched heist outside debtor's prison, Plunkett must find a way to retrieve a large ruby that his partner had swallowed. What he doesn't know is that the incident was witnessed by James Macleane (Jonny Lee Miller), a socialite from the upper echelons of society, who had found himself in debtor's prison. Macleane sees the same ruby as his ticket out of debtors' prison and decides to steal it.

Plunkett ambushes Macleane and forces him to give up the ruby, but when they are discovered by Chance's men, Plunkett swallows it. While in Newgate Prison, the two form a partnership that utilizes Plunkett's criminal know-how and Macleane's social status to bribe their way out of prison. This tentative partnership leads to an unlikely alliance, deemed "The Gentlemen Highwaymen", where they gladly relieve the gentry of their possessions.

When Macleane falls for the beautiful Lady Rebecca (Liv Tyler), the niece of the powerful Lord Gibson (Michael Gambon), their plans to escape to America go awry. The pair part ways after a disastrous attempt to rescue Lady Rebecca from forced exodus, which leads to the death of Lord Gibson, and the discovery that Macleane has gambled away all of their funds.

Macleane is eventually captured and tried for Lord Gibson's murder, earning him a date with the gallows. Plunkett orchestrates a daring escape, aided by Lady Rebecca and the flamboyant Lord Rochester (Alan Cumming). After a tense chase through the city sewers that sees Plunkett exact revenge upon Chance, the three escape to freedom.

Cast

Release and reception
Plunkett & Macleane underperformed at the US box office. The film opened on 1 October 1999 in 475 U.S. theaters, taking in $244,765 during its first three days; total US earnings stand at $474,900.

The film received mainly negative reviews; Rotten Tomatoes lists a 24% critic rating from 29 critics, while Metacritic's Metascore is 44 from 27 reviews (indicating "mixed or average reviews").

Derek Elley of Variety wrote, "[T]he script and dialogue are nowhere near well-tooled enough, and the film's generally dark, cold look and baroque design play against the lighter touch required. Though he certainly puts the reported $15 million budget up on the screen, helmer Jake Scott (son of Ridley Scott) seems happiest when pushing ahead to his next montage sequence, each of which has the brio that should have informed the whole movie." Roger Ebert said, "Here is a film overgrown with so many directorial flourishes that the heroes need machetes to hack their way to within view of the audience."

Despite being panned by the critics, it was acclaimed by worldwide audiences and has gained a cult following.

References

External links
 
 

1999 films
1990s action adventure films
1990s crime comedy films
1990s black comedy films
1990s historical comedy films
British action adventure films
British crime comedy films
British historical comedy films
Czech historical films
Czech action films
Czech adventure films
Czech comedy films
Czech crime films
1990s English-language films
Working Title Films films
Films shot at Pinewood Studios
Films set in the 1740s
Films set in the 1750s
Films with screenplays by Charles McKeown
Films shot in the Czech Republic
Films scored by Craig Armstrong (composer)
Films produced by Eric Fellner
Films produced by Tim Bevan
PolyGram Filmed Entertainment films
Films directed by Jake Scott (director)
Films with screenplays by Neal Purvis and Robert Wade
British black comedy films
1999 directorial debut films
USA Films films
Films about highwaymen
1990s British films